Shoot on Sight is a 2007 British film directed by Jag Mundhra and produced by Aron Govil. The film was marketed and distributed globally by Aron Govil Productions Inc. The cast includes Brian Cox, Sadie Frost, Naseeruddin Shah and Om Puri.

Plot
Tariq Ali (played by Naseeruddin Shah), a Muslim police commander of Scotland Yard, is asked to hunt down suspected suicide-bombers against the backdrop of the 7 July bombings in London. Ali's task becomes more  complicated as an innocent Muslim is killed by armed police on the Underground. Ali (Naseeruddin Shah), a Lahore-born British citizen married to an English woman with two children, is himself distrusted by his colleagues, despite his long service in the Metropolitan Police.

Cast

Production 
Shoot on Sight is a story based on Operation Kratos, the police "shoot-to-kill" policy applied to suspected suicide-bombers after the 7 July 2005 London bombings. The shooting of the innocent Muslim in the Underground is based on an actual event, the shooting of an innocent Brazilian on 22 July 2005 whom police thought to be a Muslim terrorist about to detonate a suicide bomb.

References

External links
 
 Reuters
 http://www.radiosargam.com/films/archives/5448/movie-preview-shoot-on-sight-2007.html
 http://www.arongovil.com/2008/sos_news.php

2007 films
Islamophobia in the United Kingdom
Films about terrorism in Europe
Films about Islam
British police films
2000s English-language films
Films directed by Jag Mundhra
2000s British films